Manja Manthrangal is a 1987 Indian Malayalam-language drama film, directed by A. Chandrasekharan. The film stars Mukesh, Rohini, Nedumudi Venu, Jayabharathi and Thilakan in the lead roles. The film has musical score by Jerry Amaldev.

Plot
Isaac, a doctor, is in search of his real parents. He is shocked to find out his mother is his neighbour Sara Thomas, and that he was abandoned in an orphanage.

Cast
Mukesh as Issac
Rohini as Gladia
Jayabharathi as Teacher Sara Thomas
Thilakan as Mathew Paul
Nedumudi Venu as Professor Varma
Mala Aravindan as Raghavan
Sabitha Anand as Lusy
Sathaar as Thomas
Jagannatha Varma as Gladia's father
Valsala Menon as Issac's mother

Soundtrack
The music was composed by Jerry Amaldev and the lyrics were written by M. D. Rajendran.

References

External links
 

1987 films
1980s Malayalam-language films